Devizes  is a constituency in Wiltshire, England, represented in the House of Commons of the UK Parliament since 2019 by Danny Kruger, a Conservative.

The constituency includes four towns and many villages in the middle and east of the county. The area's representative has been a Conservative since 1924.

History
Until 1885 Devizes was a parliamentary borough, electing two Members of Parliament (MPs) by the bloc vote system until the 1868 election, when the Reform Act 1867 reduced its representation to one MP, elected by the first-past-the-post system of election. The Redistribution of Seats Act 1885 abolished the parliamentary borough, and created a new county constituency of the same name, covering a wider area and electing one member. It has returned a Conservative MP at every election since 1924.

Its most notable MP was Henry Addington, who held the seat during his term as Prime Minister, as well as when he was Speaker of the House of Commons.

Boundaries

1885–1918: The Boroughs of Devizes and Marlborough, the Sessional Divisions of Devizes, Everley, Marlborough, and Ramsey, and part of the Sessional Division of Pewsey.

1918–1950: The Boroughs of Devizes and Marlborough, the Rural Districts of Devizes, Marlborough, Pewsey, and Ramsbury, and part of the Rural District of Highworth.

1950–1983: The Boroughs of Devizes and Marlborough, and the Rural Districts of Devizes, Highworth, Marlborough and Ramsbury, and Pewsey.

1983–1997: The District of Kennet, and the Borough of Thamesdown wards of Blunsdon, Chiseldon, Covingham, Highworth, Ridgeway, St Margaret, St Philip, and Wroughton.

1997–2010: The District of Kennet, the District of North Wiltshire wards of Calne Abberd, Calne Central, Calne North, Calne North East, Calne South, and Calne Without, and the District of West Wiltshire wards of Blackmore Forest, Melksham Forest, Melksham Lambourne, Melksham Roundpoint, Melksham Town, and Melksham Woodrow.

2010–present: The District of Kennet, and the District of Salisbury wards of Bulford and Durrington.

The Devizes constituency covers Devizes in Wiltshire and the surrounding former Kennet district, which includes the towns of Marlborough, Ludgershall and Tidworth, together with the large villages of Bulford, Durrington and Pewsey.

Members of Parliament

1295–1640

1640–1832

1832–1868

Since 1868
Devizes has been a safe Conservative seat since 1945. The current Member of Parliament is Danny Kruger who was first elected at the 2019 general election, succeeding Claire Perry, who had stood down at that election after nine years of holding the seat.

Fictional Member of Parliament
Devizes was the stated constituency of fictional Conservative MP The Honourable Sir Piers Fletcher-Dervish, Baronet, later Junior Minister for Housing, in the TV sitcom The New Statesman, which was produced and set during the same decade (1980s) that Charles Andrew Morrison was MP for the real-life seat. He was portrayed by actor Michael Troughton.

Elections

Elections in the 2010s

Elections in the 2000s

Elections in the 1990s

Elections in the 1980s

Elections in the 1970s

Elections in the 1960s

Elections in the 1950s

Elections in the 1940s 

General election 1939–40:
Another general election was required to take place before the end of 1940. The political parties had been making preparations for an election to take place from 1939 and by the end of this year, the following candidates had been selected; 
Conservative: Percy Hurd, 
Liberal: Frances Josephy

Elections in the 1930s

Elections in the 1920s

Elections in the 1910s

Election results 1885–1918

Elections in the 1880s

Elections in the 1890s

Elections in the 1900s

Elections in the 1910s 

General election 1914–15:

Another general election was required to take place before the end of 1915. The political parties had been making preparations for an election to take place and by July 1914, the following candidates had been selected; 
Unionist: Basil Peto
Liberal: James Currie

Election results 1868–1880

Elections in the 1860s

Seat reduced to one member

Elections in the 1870s

Elections in the 1880s

Election results 1832–1868

 
 

Gore resigned after defecting to the Tories, causing a by-election.

 

 

Locke's death caused a by-election.

 

Durham resigned, causing a by-election.

 

 

Dundas was appointed as Clerk of the Ordnance, requiring a by-election.

 

 Following the by-election, Dundas was unseated due to bribery and Heneage was declared elected in his place

Elections in the 1840s

 

Sotheron resigned, by accepting the office of Steward of the Chiltern Hundreds, in order to contest a by-election at North Wiltshire, causing a by-election.

 

 

Bruges resigned by accepting the office of Steward of the Chiltern Hundreds, causing a by-election.

Elections in the 1850s

Elections in the 1860s
Gladstone's death caused a by-election.

Addington succeeded to the peerage, causing a by-election.

 

 Curling retired before polling day.

Election results before 1832

 
 

 
 
 
 

 Some sources, including the corporation minutes, do not list Locke or Salmon as candidates. However, they are included here as per Stooks Smith.

See also
 List of parliamentary constituencies in Wiltshire

Notes

External links
Craig, F. W. S. (1983). British parliamentary election results 1918–1949 (3 ed.). Chichester: Parliamentary Research Services. .

References

Parliamentary constituencies in Wiltshire
Constituencies of the Parliament of the United Kingdom established in 1331
Constituencies of the Parliament of the United Kingdom represented by a sitting Prime Minister
Devizes